Good Morning Aman (also spelled Good Morning, Aman) is a 2009 Italian drama film directed by Claudio Noce, at his feature film debut.

The film premiered at the International Film Critics' Week of the 66th Venice International Film Festival. For this film, Noce was nominated for David di Donatello for best new director.

Plot

Cast  

 Valerio Mastandrea as Teodoro
 Anita Caprioli as  Sara
  Said Sabrie as  Aman
  Amin Nur as  Said
  Giordano De Plano as  Brando
  Adamo Dionisi as  Bruno

See also   
 List of Italian films of 2009
 Films about immigration to Italy

References

External links

2009 drama films
2009 films
Italian drama films
Films about immigration to Italy
2000s Italian films
2000s Italian-language films